Jeffrey M. Hovenier is an American diplomat who has served as the United States ambassador to Kosovo since 2022.

Early life and education 
Hovenier was raised in Bellingham, Washington. He earned a Bachelor of Arts degree in international relations from Brigham Young University and a Master of Arts in government and international relations from Georgetown University.

Career 
A member of the Senior Foreign Service, Hovenier has been assigned to embassies in Peru, Croatia, Greece, Panama, Germany, and Paraguay, in addition to the Organization for Security and Co-operation in Europe. Hovenier also served as the director for Central and Southeastern European affairs for the United States National Security Council. Hovenier also served in the U.S. Embassy in Ankara, Turkey as its charge d’affaires from August 2018 to July 2019, and Deputy chief of mission from August 2018 to July 2021, when Scott M. Oudkirk assumed his post as DCM.

United States ambassador to Kosovo
On July 2, 2021, President Joe Biden nominated Hovenier to serve as United States Ambassador to Kosovo. On October 5, 2021, a hearing on his nomination was held before the Senate Foreign Relations Committee. On October 19, 2021, his nomination was reported favorably out of committee. The United States Senate confirmed him on November 18, 2021, by voice vote. He presented his credentials to President Vjosa Osmani in Pristina on January 10, 2022.

Personal life
Hovenier speaks German, Greek, Croatian, and Spanish.

References 

Living people
Year of birth missing (living people)
Place of birth missing (living people)
21st-century American diplomats
Ambassadors of the United States to Kosovo
Brigham Young University alumni
Georgetown University alumni
People from Bellingham, Washington
United States Department of State officials
United States Foreign Service personnel